In number theory, Iwasawa theory is the study of objects of arithmetic interest over infinite towers of number fields. In the early 1970s, Barry Mazur considered generalizations of Iwasawa theory to abelian varieties. More recently (early 1990s), Ralph Greenberg has proposed an Iwasawa theory for motives.

Formulation
Iwasawa worked with so-called -extensions - infinite extensions of a number field  with Galois group  isomorphic to the additive group of p-adic integers for some prime p. (These were called -extensions in early papers.)

More generally, Iwasawa theory asks questions about the structure of Galois modules over extensions with Galois group a p-adic Lie group.

Example
Iwasawa considered the following tower of number fields:

where  is the field generated by adjoining to  the pn+1-st roots of unity and

There are norm maps  whenever , and this gives us the data of an inverse system. If we set

then it is not hard to see from the inverse limit construction that  is a module over  In fact,  is a module over the Iwasawa algebra . This is a 2-dimensional, regular local ring, and this makes it possible to describe modules over it. From this description it is possible to recover information about the p-part of the class group of 

The motivation here is that the p-torsion in the ideal class group of  had already been identified by Kummer as the main obstruction to the direct proof of Fermat's Last Theorem.

Connections with p-adic analysis
From this beginning in the 1950s, a substantial theory has been built up. A fundamental connection was noticed between the module theory, and the p-adic L-functions that were defined in the 1960s by Kubota and Leopoldt. The latter begin from the Bernoulli numbers, and use interpolation to define p-adic analogues of the Dirichlet L-functions. It became clear that the theory had prospects of moving ahead finally from Kummer's century-old results on regular primes.

Iwasawa formulated the main conjecture of Iwasawa theory as an assertion that two methods of defining p-adic L-functions (by module theory, by interpolation) should coincide, as far as that was well-defined. These proofs were modeled upon Ken Ribet's proof of the converse to Herbrand's theorem (the so-called Herbrand–Ribet theorem).

Generalizations
The Galois group of the infinite tower, the starting field, and the sort of arithmetic module studied can all be varied. In each case, there is a main conjecture linking the tower to a p-adic L-function.

In 2002, Christopher Skinner and Eric Urban claimed a proof of a main conjecture for GL(2). In 2010, they posted a preprint .

See also
Ferrero–Washington theorem
Tate module of a number field

References
Sources

 

Citations

Further reading

External links

Field (mathematics)
Cyclotomic fields
Class field theory